Guerino Capretti (born 5 February 1982) is a German former footballer and current coach of FC Ingolstadt.

Managerial statistics

References

External links

1982 births
Living people
German footballers
Italian footballers
Association football defenders
SC Paderborn 07 players
SC Paderborn 07 II players
FC Gütersloh 2000 players
SC Preußen Münster players
SC Verl players
3. Liga managers
2. Bundesliga managers
SC Verl managers
Dynamo Dresden managers
FC Ingolstadt 04 managers
German football managers
Italian football managers
German people of Italian descent
Italian expatriate football managers